Compsoctena indecorella is a moth in the family Eriocottidae. It was described by Francis Walker in 1856. It is found in India.

Adults are cinereous (ash grey) brown, the forewings very minutely blackish speckled. The hindwings are more cinereous, very minutely brown speckled.

References

Moths described in 1856
Compsoctena
Moths of Asia